Orange-Book-Standard (Az. KZR 39/06) is a decision issued on May 6, 2009 by the Federal Court of Justice of Germany (BGH) on the interaction between patent law and technical standards, and more generally between intellectual property law and competition law. The Court held that a defendant, accused of patent infringement and who was not able to obtain a license from the patentee, may defend himself, under certain conditions, by invoking an abuse of a dominant market position.

The name "Orange-Book-Standard" comes from the Orange Book that contained the format specifications for CD-Rs, the technology at issue in the case that led to the Orange-Book-Standard decision.

See also 
 Essential patent
 European Union competition law
 Rainbow Books, the collection of standards defining the formats of Compact Discs, including the Orange Book standard
 Reasonable and non-discriminatory licensing (RAND)

References

External links 
  Decision (case number: "KZR 39/06") (a translation is available here)

Further reading:
 Stephan Dorn, Green-Orange-Red, the German Orange-Book decision is putting industry on alert, IPEG, September 14, 2009.

Competition law
European Union case law
German patent case law
Works about competition law